Ándale Bernardo is a bronze sculpture by Jim Demetro, installed in Puerto Vallarta's Lázaro Cárdenas Park, in the Mexican state of Jalisco. According to Banderas News, the artwork "honors all the workers, burros, residents, and visitors who make Puerto Vallarta such a wonderful place".

References

External links

 

Bronze sculptures in Mexico
Donkeys in art
Outdoor sculptures in Puerto Vallarta
Sculptures of men in Mexico
Statues in Jalisco
Zona Romántica